Franklin Pierce (1804–1869) was the president of the United States from 1853 to 1857.

Frank Pierce or Franklin Pierce may also refer to:
 Frank Pierce (athlete) (1883–1908), American athlete
 Jack Pierce (politician) or Franklin Jack Pierce (born 1937), Ontario politician

See also
 Franklin Pearce (disambiguation)